Plagiotheciaceae is a family of mosses from the order Hypnales. It is found almost nearly worldwide, including Antarctica. Located primarily in temperate latitudes and at higher elevations in the tropics.

Named after Plagiothecium, which has over 150 species.

It originally had 2 subfamilies, Plagiothecioideae (which contained Catagonium and Plagiothecium), and Stereophylloideae (which contained Entodontopsis, Pilosium, Stenocarpidopsis, Stenocarpidium and Sterephyllum).

Genera
As accepted by GBIF;
 Acrocladiopsis 
 Bardunovia 
 Complanato-Hypnum 
 Isocladiella 
 Isopterygiella 
 Isopterygiopsis 
 Ortholimnobium 
 Pilaisaea 
 Plagiotheciella 
 Plagiothecium 
 Pseudotaxiphyllum 
 Saviczia 
 Sharpiella

References

Other sources
 Buck, W. R. and R. R. Ireland. 1985. A reclassification of the Plagiotheciaceae. Nova Hedwigia 41: 89–125.

Hypnales
Moss families